Sandy Islands Provincial Park is a non-operating park in the nature reserve class consisting of . It is located in the large Whitefish Bay, near the mouth of the smaller Batchawana Bay in Lake Superior near Sault Ste. Marie, Ontario. The islands have an elevation of 183 meters above sea level. There are two islands, North Sandy Island and South Sandy Island. When the weather is clear the islands are visible from Pancake Bay Provincial Park close to the horizon looking south. The park was created as a measure to protect the fragile ecology of these sand islands.

References

External links

Provincial parks of Ontario
Parks in Algoma District
Protected areas established in 2001
2001 establishments in Ontario